Maesiella dominguezi is a species of sea snail, a marine gastropod mollusk in the family Pseudomelatomidae, the turrids and allies.

The generic name Maesiella is named in honor of the American malacologist Virginia Orr Maes.

Description
The length of the shell varies between 7 mm and 9.5 mm.

Distribution
This marine species occurs off  Isla La Orchila, Venezuela and Aruba.

References

 Gibson-Smith, J., and W. Gibson-Smith. "New Recent gastropod species from Venezuela and a bivalve range extension." The Veliger 25 (1983): 177-181.

External links
 
 Gastropods.com: Maesiella dominguezi
 Tucker, J.K. 2004 Catalog of recent and fossil turrids (Mollusca: Gastropoda). Zootaxa 682:1–1295.
 Worldwide Mollusc Species Data Base: Thelecythara dominguezi

dominguezi
Gastropods described in 1983